

Nakhichevan-on-Don (Naxičevan’-na-Donu), also known as New Nakhichevan (Nor Naxiĵevan; as opposed to the "old" Nakhichevan), was an Armenian-populated town near Rostov-on-Don, in southern Russia founded in 1779 by Armenians from Crimea. It retained the status of a city until 1928 when it was merged with Rostov.

History

In the summer of 1778, after the Crimean Khanate was made a Russian vassal state, some 12,600 Armenians of the Crimean peninsula were resettled by General Alexander Suvorov in the Don region. The Russian Empire sought to strengthen Novorossiya, which was vital in completely absorbing the Crimea. Empress Catherine the Great granted some 86,000 ha of land to the Armenians by a November 14, 1779 decree. The project of resettlement was promoted and financed by Count Hovhannes Lazarian.

A third of the Armenians perished en route and during the first winter. The settlement of New Nakhichevan was founded by the survivors. It "rapidly grew into an important town with its own cathedral and seminary." In 1894 the Armenian community erected the Alexander Column in Nakhichevan-on-Don to celebrate the Emperor Alexander II of Russia.

Around the turn of the twentieth century it was part of the Don Host Oblast. In 1896 it had an estimated population of 32,174, of which 14,618 (45.4%) were native residents and 17,556 (54.6%) were nonresidents. The Armenian Apostolic population was estimated at 18,895 (58.7%), Orthodox at 10,965 (34.1%), others (Jews, Old Believers, Muslims, Catholics, Protestants) at 2,314 (7.1%). According to the 1897 Russian Imperial census the city had a population of 28,427. East Slavic-speakers (Russians, Ukrainians and Belarusians) made up around two-thirds of the population (19,224), while Armenians (8,277) comprised a significant minority (29.1%).

Merger with Rostov and later history
By the late 19th century it was "engulfed by the growth of Rostov." As early as 1897, the entry in the Brockhaus and Efron Encyclopedic Dictionary said about the city: "Currently, Nakhichevan-on-Don has merged with Rostov so that the boundaries of the two cities can only be determined by a plan approved 11 May 1811." On 28 December 1928, Nor Nakhichevan was officially made part of Rostov. In 1929, the area was redesignated as the Proletarsky raion (Пролетарский район), Rostov's largest district. As of 2001, it amounted to a "kind of Armenian quarter within the city." According to the 2010 Russian census, of the 41,553 Armenians in the city of Rostov-on-Don, 10,008 or almost 25% of all Armenians live in the Proletarsky district, where they make up more than 8% of the population, well above the city's total percentage of Armenians (at 3.8%).

Notable people from Nakhichevan-on-Don
 Raphael Patkanian (1830–1892), Armenian writer
 Mikayel Nalbandian (1839–1866), Armenian writer
 George VI of Armenia (1868–1954), Catholicos of All Armenians
 Martiros Saryan (1880–1972), Armenian painter
 Simon Vratsian (1882–1969), Prime Minister of the First Republic of Armenia
 Sargis Lukashin (Srabionian) (1883–1937), chairman of the Council of People's Commissars (1922–1925)
 Sergei Galadzhev (1902–1954), Soviet general
 Gevork Vartanian (1924–2012), Soviet intelligence agent
 Alexander Miasnikian (1886–1925), chairman of the Council of People's Commissars (1921–1922) of the Armenian Soviet Socialist Republic
 Ervand Kogbetliantz (1888–1974), mathematician and first president of Yerevan State University
 Nina Garsoïan (1923–2022), historian
 Mikhail Chailakhyan (1902–1991), scientist
 Marietta Shaginyan (1888–1982), historian and writer
 Ashot Melkonian (1930–2009), artist
 Miron Merzhanov (1895–1975), personal architect to Stalin
 Constantin Alajalov (1900–1987), Armenian-American painter and illustrator; created more than 70 front covers for The New Yorker
 Stepan Kechekjan (1890–1967), lawyer and historian
 Avet Ter-Gabrielyan (1899–1983), violinist and founder of the Komitas Quartet
 Gayane Chebotaryan (1918–1998), composer and musicologist
 Ashot Melkonian (1930-2009), artist
 Alexander Kemurdzhian (1921–2003), mechanical engineer who designed Lunokhod 1, the first ever planetary rover for space exploration

See also
 Holy Cross Church, Nakhichevan on Don
 Armenians in Russia
 Myasnikovsky District, a nearby raion (district) with an Armenian majority. It includes several villages that date back to the same period.
 List of Armenian ethnic enclaves

References

Armenian diaspora communities
Armenian diaspora in Russia
Cities and towns in Rostov Oblast